Fisher Strait is a natural waterway through the central Canadian Arctic Archipelago in the territory of Nunavut. It separates Southampton Island (to the north-west) from Coats Island (to the south-east). To the south-west the strait opens into Hudson Bay.

Straits of Kivalliq Region